KCJP-LP is a low power radio station broadcasting to El Centro, California. It is broadcast on 95.7 FM. Currently, it is a Roman Catholic talk station serving the Imperial Valley in Southern California.

History
KCJP-LP began broadcasting on May 19, 2014.

References

External links

 

El Centro, California
2015 establishments in California
CJP-LP
Radio stations established in 2015
CJP-LP